The 2018–19 UTSA Roadrunners women's basketball team represents the University of Texas at San Antonio during the 2018–19 NCAA Division I women's basketball season. The Roadrunners, led by second year head coach Kristen Holt, play their home games at the Convocation Center and were members of Conference USA. They finished the season 7–21, 2–14 in Conference USA play to finish in a 3 way tie for twelfth place. Due to a tie breaker loss to Florida Atlantic and FIU they failed to qualify for the Conference USA women's tournament.

Roster

Schedule

|-
!colspan=9 style=| Exhibition

|-
!colspan=9 style=| Non-conference regular season

|-
!colspan=9 style=| Conference USA regular season

See also
2018–19 UTSA Roadrunners men's basketball team

References

UTSA Roadrunners women's basketball seasons
UTSA Roadrunners
UTSA Roadrunners
UTSA Roadrunners